Overtone singing – also known as overtone chanting, harmonic singing, polyphonic overtone singing, and diphonic singing – is a set of singing techniques in which the vocalist manipulates the resonances of the vocal tract, in order to arouse the perception  of additional, separate notes beyond the fundamental frequency being produced.

From a fundamental pitch, made by the human voice, the belonging harmonic overtones can be selectively amplified by changing the vocal tract, i.e. the dimensions and  shape of the resonant cavities of the mouth and the pharynx. This resonant tuning allows singers to create more than one pitch at the same time (the fundamental and one or more selected overtones), while usually generating a single fundamental frequency with their vocal folds.

Overtone singing should not be confused with throat singing, in spite of the fact that many throat singing techniques comprise overtone singing. As mentioned, overtone singing involves the careful manipulations of the vocal tract, whereas throat singing is mostly related to the voice source.

Asia

Mongolia and Buryatia 

It is thought that the art of overtone singing originated in southwestern Mongolia in today's Khovd Province and Govi Altai region. Nowadays, overtone singing is found throughout the country and Mongolia is often considered the most active center of overtone singing in the world. The most commonly practiced style, called , can be divided up into the following categories:

  / labial khöömii
  / palatal khöömii
  / nasal khöömii
  / glottal, throat khöömii
  / chest cavity, stomach khöömii
  / khöömii combined with long song

Tuva 

Tuvan overtone singing is practiced in the Republic of Tuva (southern Siberia, Russia).

The Tuvan way of singing overtones is based on appreciation of complex sounds with multiple layers or textures, which is how the Tuvans developed a wide range of rhythmic and melodic styles during the centuries. Styles include:
 
 
  (which also uses a second sound source made by false vocal folds. This technique is called "false-folds-diplophony")

Other sub-styles include:
 ,
 ,
 ,
 .
  (a unique type of vibrato, mainly applied to khöömei and kargyraa styles)

The melodies are traditionally created by using the 6th, 8th, 9th, 10th, 12th, 13th and sometimes the 16th harmonics, which form the major pentatonic scale, so the 7th and 11th harmonics are carefully skipped.

The most peculiar melody, from Tuvan tradition, is "", mostly performed in kargyraa style.

Altai and Khakassia 
Tuva's neighbouring Russian regions, the Altai Republic to the west and Khakassia to the northwest, have developed forms of throat singing called kai (qay) or khai (xay). In Altai, this is used mostly for epic poetry performance, to the instrumental accompaniment of a topshur. Altai narrators perform in kargyraa, khöömei, and sygyt styles, which are similar to those in Tuva. They also have their own style, a very high harmonics, emerging from kargyraa. Variations of kai are:
 ,
 ,
 , and
 .
The first well-known kai-chi was Kalkin.

Chukchi Peninsula 
The Chukchi people of the Chukchi Peninsula in the extreme northeast of Russia also practice a form of throat singing.

Tibet 
Tibetan Buddhist chanting is a subgenre of throat singing, mainly practiced by monks of Tibet, including Khokhonor (Qinghai) province in the Tibetan plateau area, Tibetan monks of Nepal, Bhutan, India, and various locations in the Himalayan region. Most often the chants hold to the lower pitches possible in throat singing. Various ceremonies and prayers call for throat singing in Tibetan Buddhism, often with more than one monk chanting at a time.
There are different Tibetan throat singing styles, such as Gyuke, which uses the lowest pitch of voice; Dzoke; and Gyer.

Uzbekistan and Kazakhstan

Pakistan, Iran and Afghanistan
Balochi Nur Sur is one of the ancient forms of overtone singing and is still popular in parts of Pakistan, Iran, and Afghanistan – especially in the Sulaiman Mountains.

Kurdistan 
Dengbêj, the Kurdish-Yazidi style of bardic chanting, often incorporates overtones as part of the chant, and in a way which is distinct from other forms of overtone singing. There is an article 'Dengbêj - Kurdish long song and overtone singing' by Nick Hobbs in 2020 where he discusses the use of overtones in dengbêj in some detail. Dengbêj is largely a traditional style of Turkish Kurdistan and practitioners are mostly Anatolian. Dengbêj singers often also sing Kurdish folk song but overtones can rarely be heard in Kurdish traditional music outside of dengbêj.

Europe

Sardinia

On the island of Sardinia (Italy), especially in the subregion of Barbagia, one of the two different styles of polyphonic singing is marked by the use of throat singing. This kind of choir is called "singing a tenore". The other style, known as cuncordu, does not use throat singing. Boche and mesu boche sing in a regular voice, whereas contra and bassu sings with the use of the false vocal folds, just like the Tuvan Khoomei and Kargyraa techniques. In 2005, Unesco classed the cantu a tenore as an intangible world heritage. The most well known groups who perform the singing a Tenore are from Bitti, Orosei, Oniferi, and Neoneli. Each town has usually more than one group, and their name is based on a specific place, or monument, and then their hometown: for example:  Tenore Su Remediu(place) de Orosei(Town).

Northern Europe
The Sami people of the northern parts of Sweden, Norway, Finland, and the Kola Peninsula in Russia have a singing genre called yoik.  While overtone techniques are not a defining feature of yoik, individuals sometimes utilize overtones in the production of yoik.

Bashkortostan
The Bashkirs of Bashkortostan, Russia have a style of overtone singing called özläü (sometimes spelled uzlyau; Bashkort Өзләү), which has nearly died out. In addition, Bashkorts also sing uzlyau while playing the kurai, a national instrument. This technique of vocalizing into a flute can also be found in folk music as far west as the Balkans and Hungary.

Andalusia
In Flamenco's Cante Jondo singers often include overtonal colour at the end of phrases. Perhaps originating as a way of facilitating sustain, and then becoming an appreciated ornamentation in its own right. There are many examples but Carmen Linares and Duquende often incorporate overtones.

Africa

South Africa
Some Thembu Xhosa women of South Africa have a low, rhythmic style of throat-singing, similar to the Tuvan Kargyraa style, that is called unngqokolo. It is often accompanied by call-and-response vocals and complicated poly-rhythms.

Non-traditional styles

Canada, United States, and Europe
The 1920s Texan singer of cowboy songs, Arthur Miles, independently created a style of overtone singing, similar to sygyt, as a supplement to the normal yodelling of country western music. Blind Willie Johnson, also of Texas, is not a true overtone singer according to National Geographic, but his ability to shift from guttural grunting noises to a soft lullaby is suggestive of the tonal timbres of overtone singing.

Starting in the 1960s, some musicians in the West either have collaborated with traditional throat singers or ventured into the realm of throat singing and overtone singing, or both. Some made original musical contributions and helped this art rediscover its transcultural universality. As harmonics are universal to all physical sounds, the notion of authenticity is best understood in terms of musical quality. Musicians of note in this genre include Collegium Vocale Köln (who first began using this technique in 1968), Michael Vetter, Tran Quang Hai, David Hykes, Jill Purce, Jim Cole, Ry Cooder, Paul Pena (mixing the traditional Tuvan style with that of American Blues), Steve Sklar, and Kiva (specializing in jazz/ world beat genres and composing for overtone choirs). Others include composer Baird Hersey and his group Prana with Krishna Das (overtone singing and Hindu mantra), as well as Canadian songwriter Nathan Rogers, who has become an adept throat singer and teaches Tuvan throat singing in Winnipeg, Manitoba.

Paul Pena was featured in the documentary Genghis Blues, which tells the story of his pilgrimage to Tuva to compete in their annual throat singing competition. The film won the documentary award at the 1999 Sundance Film Festival, and was nominated for an Oscar in 2000.

Tuvan singer Sainkho Namtchylak has collaborated with free jazz musicians such as Evan Parker and Ned Rothenberg. Lester Bowie and Ornette Coleman have worked with the Tenores di Bitti, and Eleanor Hovda has written a piece using the Xhosa style of singing. DJs and performers of electronic music like The KLF have also merged their music with throat singing, overtone singing, or with the theory of harmonics behind it.

Tran Quang Hai, a researcher on overtone singing since 1969 in Paris, France, has published many articles, videos on overtone singing from 1971. His film "The Song of Harmonics" directed by Hugo Zemp in 1989 obtained 4 international prizes in Estonia (1990) France (1990) and Canada (1991).

David Hykes, a pioneer in new music, contemplative chant and healing sounds, founded Harmonic Chant in New York in 1975, the year he also founded his legendary group, The Harmonic Choir, considered to be one of the world's pre-eminent overtone ensembles.

Wolfgang Saus, from Germany, is considered one of the major teachers/performers of "polyphonic overtone singing" in Europe. Formerly trained as a classical baritone, his unique skills make him instantly recognizable. He's also a renowned composer and arranger of polyphonic overtone singing music for solo voice and choirs.

A cappella singer Avi Kaplan also exhibited overtone singing during his group's (Pentatonix) performances. He merged throat singing together with a cappella dubstep.

The Overtone Choir Spektrum from Prague, Czech Republic, is unique among overtone choirs, particularly because it connects traditional choir singing with overtone techniques. It is the only one of its kind in the Czech Republic, and one of only a few in the world. 

MuOM Ecstatic Voices is another unique and peculiar overtone singing choir, as it combines in its own compositions Western overtone singing and Tuvan/Mongolian throat singing techniques (such as kargyraa, khoomei, sygyt, ezengiler, bonbarnadyr, among others). Created in Barcelona in 2008, with 8 singers on average, it has specialised in the creation of overtone polyphonies, (each singer is emitting an overtone) in addition to the polyphony of the fundamentals, creating two distinguishable sound planes.

Sherden Overtone Choir was founded in 2016 in Sardinia by Ilaria Orefice and Giovanni Bortoluzzi. The choir combines Tuvan Throat Singing Styles with Sardinian Throat singing.

Contemporary multi-instrumentalist performer The Suitcase Junket employs a self-taught overtone singing, or throat singing technique in his live and recorded performances.

Several contemporary classical composers have incorporated overtone singing into their works. Karlheinz Stockhausen was one of the first, with Stimmung in 1968. Tran Quang Hai (b.1944), a French national of Vietnamese origin, created the composition "Ve Nguon" with the collaboration of Vietnamese composer Nguyen Van Tuong in 1975, in Paris. "Past Life Melodies" for SATB chorus by Australian composer Sarah Hopkins (b. 1958) also calls for this technique. In Water Passion after St. Matthew by Tan Dun, the soprano and bass soloists sing in a variety of techniques including overtone singing of the Mongolian style.

In 2014 German singer Anna-Maria Hefele went viral on YouTube with her "polyphonic overtone" singing. The Huffington Post has commented on her "amazing ability" and her singing being "utterly bizarre". On 10 October 2014, she was number two on The Guardian's Viral Video Chart, with one online video titled Polyphonic Overtone Singing, which features Hefele as she demonstrates and explains overtones. As of February 2023, this video has received more than 20 million views.

Istanbul-based British singer Nikolai Galen incorporates overtones into his experimental work. They can be heard on his solo album Emanuel Vigeland, the Black Paintings album Screams and Silence and the Hoca Nasreddin album A Headful of Birds.

See also
 Human voice
 List of overtone musicians

Notes

References
 Bandinu, Omar (2006). "Il canto a tenore: dai nuraghi all'Unesco", Siti 2, no.3 (July–September): 16–21.
 Bellamy, Isabel, and Donald MacLean (2005). Radiant Healing: The Many Paths to Personal Harmony and Planetary Wholeness. Buddina, Queensland (Australia): Joshua Books. 
 Haouli, Janete El (2006). Demetrio Stratos: en busca de la voz-música. México, D. F.: Radio Educación – Consejo Nacional para la Cultura y las Artes.
 Hefele, Eklund & McAllister (2019). "Polyphonic Overtone Singing: An Acoustic and Physiological (MRI) Analysis and a First-person Description of a Unique Mode of Singing". In: Mattias Heldner (ed.): Proceedings from Fonetik 2019, 10–12 June 2019, Stockholm, Sweden. PERILUS XXVII,  (print version),  (electronic version), pp. 91–96.
 Levin, Theodore C., and Michael E. Edgerton (1999). "The Throat Singers of Tuva". Scientific American 281, no. 3 (September): 80–87.
 Levin, Theodore, and Valentina Süzükei (2006). Where Rivers and Mountains Sing. Bloomington: Indiana University Press. .
 Pariser, David, and Enid Zimmerman (2004). "Learning in the Visual Arts: Characteristics of Gifted and Talented Individuals," in Handbook of Research and Policy in Art Education, Elliot W. Eisner and Michael D. Day (editors). Lawrence Erlbaum Associates. p. 388. .
 Saus, Wolfgang (2004). Oberton Singen. Schönau im Odenwald: Traumzeit-Verlag.  (German).
 Sklar, Steve (2005). "Types of throat singing" ""
 Titze, Ingo R. (1994). Principles of Voice Production. Englewood Cliffs, NJ: Prentice Hall.  Reprinted Iowa City: National Center for Voice and Speech, 2000. (NCVS.org)  .
 Titze, Ingo R. (2008). "The Human Instrument". Scientific American 298, no. 1 (July):94–101. PM 18225701
 Tongeren, Mark C. van (2002). Overtone Singing: Physics and Metaphysics of Harmonics in East and West. Amsterdam: Fusica.  (pbk),  (cloth).
 Tran Quang Hai (2018) "50 Years of Research in Vietnamese Traditional Music and Overtone Singing". 462p, Tu Sach Khai Tri, California, USA,

External links

 Overtone singing used in choir music – Overtone Choir Spektrum & Jan Stanek
 Overtone singing in a water tower – Jim Cole & Spectral Voices
 Audio samples of overtone and throat singing
 Online overtone singing generator
 Ken-Ichi Sakakibara Overtone singing research.
 Harmonic singing vs. normal singing – acoustical measurements and explanation
 Scientific American: The Throat Singers of Tuva
 Types of Throat Singing with Tips /Tuvan Throat-Singing by Steve Sklar
 Observation of the Laryngeal Movements for Throat Singing: Vibration of two pairs of folds in human larynx
 Audio samples of throat singing
 www.overtonesinging.com Overtone Singing with Rollin Rachele
 Tuva throat singers on Flickr
 Kiva's audio samples and information on overtone singing
 Read in Serbian on muzickacentrala.com
 Chukchi throat singing (Zoïa Tagrin'a, Olga Letykaï)
 Overtone singing music
  – articles, video clips on overtone singing in Tuva, Mongolia, South Africa, Tibet
  – articles, video clips on overtone singing in the world.

Inuit music
Throat singing
Tuvan music
Mongolian traditional music
Singing techniques
Soviet culture